The West Indies cricket team toured India from September to November 2018 to play two Tests, five One Day Internationals (ODIs) and three Twenty20 International (T20I) matches. Ahead of the Test series, there was a two-day practice match in Vadodara.

Jason Holder was ruled out of the first Test due to an injury, with Kraigg Brathwaite captaining the West Indies in his place. India won the match, their 100th win in Tests at home. India went on to win the second Test by 10 wickets, winning the series 2–0. It was India's tenth consecutive series win at home in Tests.

The second ODI was the 950th ODI to be played by India, becoming first team to achieve the milestone. During the match, India's captain Virat Kohli became the fastest batsman to score 10,000 runs in ODIs, taking 205 innings, beating the previous record of 259 innings set by Sachin Tendulkar. India went on to win the five-match ODI series 3–1, after the second ODI ended in a tie.

India's regular wicket-keeper for limited overs matches, MS Dhoni, was not named in the side's squad for the T20I fixtures for this series and the ones against Australia. Instead, India's Test wicket-keeper, Rishabh Pant, was selected in Dhoni's place. Rohit Sharma was also named as India's captain for the T20I matches against the West Indies, with Virat Kohli being rested. India won the T20I series 3–0.

Background
Originally, one of the ODI matches had been allocated to the Greenfield International Stadium in Thiruvananthapuram, per the Board of Control for Cricket in India's (BCCI) Tours and Fixtures Committee. However, when the fixtures were announced in March 2018, the match was allocated to the Jawaharlal Nehru Stadium in Kochi instead. The Kerala Cricket Association (KCA) requested that the BCCI reviews the decision. Two days later, the BCCI announced the fixture would be played in Thiruvananthapuram.

In September 2018, it was confirmed that the Ekana International Cricket Stadium in Lucknow would host its first ever international match. The last time Lucknow hosted an international match was in January 1994, when India played a Test match against Sri Lanka at the K. D. Singh Babu Stadium. Later the same month, it was reported that the second ODI match may be moved from the Holkar Stadium in Indore, due to a row about complimentary-ticket allocations. On 3 October 2018, the BCCI confirmed that the second ODI would be moved to the Dr. Y. S. Rajasekhara Reddy ACA–VDCA Cricket Stadium, in Visakhapatnam. On 12 October 2018, the BCCI moved the fourth ODI from the Wankhede Stadium to Brabourne Stadium due to administrative issues. On the day before the second T20I, the Ekana Stadium was renamed in honour of Atal Bihari Vajpayee.

Squads

Before the start of the tour, Alzarri Joseph was ruled out of the West Indies' Test squad and was replaced by Shermon Lewis. Evin Lewis withdrew from the West Indies' limited-overs squads due to personal reasons. Kieran Powell and Nicholas Pooran replaced him in the ODI and T20I squads respectively. Ashley Nurse suffered an injury during the fourth ODI, and was ruled out of the next ODI match and the T20I series. Andre Russell was ruled out of the West Indies' T20I squad due to injury, and Shai Hope was added to the squad.

Shardul Thakur was ruled out of India's ODI squad and was replaced by Umesh Yadav. Bhuvneshwar Kumar and Jasprit Bumrah were added to India's ODI squad for the last three matches of the series, with Mohammed Shami being dropped. Kedar Jadhav was added to India's ODI squad for the fourth and fifth ODIs. Jasprit Bumrah, Kuldeep Yadav and Umesh Yadav were rested for the third T20I and Siddarth Kaul was added India's T20I squad.

Tour match

Two-day match: Indian Board President's XI vs West Indies

Test series

1st Test

2nd Test

ODI series

1st ODI

2nd ODI

3rd ODI

4th ODI

5th ODI

T20I series

1st T20I

2nd T20I

3rd T20I

Notes

References

External links
 Series home at ESPN Cricinfo

2018 in West Indian cricket
2018 in Indian cricket
International cricket competitions in 2018–19
West Indian cricket tours of India